Giants in the Earth (Norwegian: I de dage) is a novel by Norwegian-American author Ole Edvart Rølvaag. First published in Norwegian as two volumes in 1924 and 1925, it was published in English in 1927, translated by Rølvaag and author Lincoln Colcord (1883–1947).

Overview
The novel follows a pioneer Norwegian immigrant family's struggles with the land and the elements of the Dakota Territory as they try to make a new life in America. In 1873, Per Hansa, his wife Beret, their children settle in the Dakota Territory. They are joined by three other Norwegian immigrant families—Tonseten and his wife Kjersti, Hans Olsa and his wife Sorine, and the Solum brothers.

Part of a trilogy, it had two sequels: Peder Victorious (Peder Seier) in 1928  and Their Fathers' God (Den signede dag)  in 1931. The books were based partly on Rølvaag's personal experiences as a settler as well as the experiences of his wife’s family who had been immigrant homesteaders in South Dakota. The novels depict snow storms, locusts, poverty, hunger, loneliness, homesickness, the difficulty of fitting into a new culture, and the estrangement of immigrant children who grow up in a new land.

Giants in the Earth was turned into an opera of the same name by Douglas Moore and Arnold Sundgaard; it won the Pulitzer Prize for Music in 1951.

See also
Freitag, Florian  (2013) The Farm Novel in North America: Genre and Nation in the United States, English Canada, and French Canada, 1845-1945 (Boydell & Brewer) 
Haugen, Einar (1983) Ole Edvart Rölvaag  (Boston: Twayne) 
Jorgenson, Theodore, and Nora Solum  (1939) Ole Edvart Rölvaag: A Biography (New York: Harper and Brothers) 
Simonson, Harold P. (1987)  Prairies Within: The Tragic Trilogy of Ole Rölvaag (Seattle: University of Washington Press)

References

External links
Introduction to the text edition of Rolvaag's Giants in the Earth (Copyright 1929 by Harper and Brothers)
The Scandinavian Immigrant Writer in America   (Dorothy Burton Skardal. The Norwegian-American Historical Association. Volume 21: Page 14)

Norwegian-language novels
Novels set in Dakota Territory
Works about Norwegian-American culture
Novels about immigration to the United States
Novels adapted into operas